{{Speciesbox
| name = Chameleon orchid
| image = Caladenia dimidia.jpg
| image_caption = Caladenia dimidia in Dragon Rocks Nature Reserve
| status_system = 
| status = 
| genus = Caladenia
| species = dimidia
| authority = Hopper & A.P.Br.
| synonyms = *Calonema dimidium (Hopper & A.P.Br.) D.L.Jones & M.A.Clem. 
Jonesiopsis dimidia (Hopper & A.P.Br.) D.L.Jones & M.A.Clem. }}Caladenia dimidia, commonly known as the chameleon orchid is a species of orchid endemic to the south-west of Western Australia. It has a single hairy leaf and one or two yellow, cream-coloured or pinkish flowers. It is a variable species, similar to the Joseph's spider orchid (C. polychroma) but has a more northerly distribution and smaller flowers.thumb|225px|Caladenia dimidia close-up of labellum

 Description Caladenia dimidia is a terrestrial, perennial, deciduous, herb with an underground tuber and which grows as a solitary plant or in small clumps. The leaf is pale green and has purple-red blotches near its base.

The bases of the sepals and petals are linear to lance-shaped and held stiffly for about one-third, then suddenly narrow to a dark brown, densely glandular thread-like section. The labellum is white or pale yellow with maroon stripes, spots and blotches. The sides of the labellum curve upwards and have a fringe of small teeth decreasing in size towards the front of the labellum. There are 6 to 14 creamy-white or pale pink, narrow anvil-shaped calli in two rows in the centre of the labellum for at least half of its length. Flowering occurs from July to late September. This species is similar to Caladenia polychroma but its flowers, especially its labellum is smaller.

Taxonomy and namingCaladenia dimidia was first formally described by Stephen Hopper and Andrew Brown in 2001 from a specimen collected by Hopper south-east of Hyden. The description was published in Nuytsia. The specific epithet (dimidia) is Latin word meaning "half" referring to the characters of this species being half-way between those of C. polychroma and C. paradoxa.

 Distribution and habitat 
The chameleon orchid is a common orchid in the eastern wheatbelt from near Paynes Find to near Ravensthorpe in the Avon Wheatbelt, Coolgardie, Esperance Plains, Geraldton Sandplains, Jarrah Forest, and Mallee biogeographic regions where it grows in a range of habitats that are generally wet in winter.

ConservationCaladenia dimidia'' is classified as "not threatened" by the Western Australian Government Department of Parks and Wildlife.

References

dimidia
Orchids of Western Australia
Endemic orchids of Australia
Plants described in 2001
Endemic flora of Western Australia
Taxa named by Stephen Hopper
Taxa named by Andrew Phillip Brown